Amerila fennia is a species of moth of the subfamily Arctiinae. It was described by Herbert Druce in 1887. It is found in Cameroon, the Democratic Republic of the Congo, Gabon, Ghana, Ivory Coast, Liberia, Nigeria, Senegal, Tanzania, the Gambia and Uganda.

The larvae feed on Dracaena species.

References

Moths described in 1887
Amerilini
Moths of Africa
Insects of Cameroon
Insects of West Africa
Insects of Tanzania